Martin Marxer (born 4 October 1999) is a Swiss-born Liechtensteiner footballer who plays as a centre-back for Swiss club FC Muri-Gümligen and the Liechtenstein national team.

Career
Marxer made his international debut for Liechtenstein on 28 March 2021 in a 2022 FIFA World Cup qualification match against North Macedonia, which finished as a 5–0 away loss.

Career statistics

International

References

External links
 
 Martin Marxer at LFV.li 

1999 births
Living people
People from Bellinzona
Liechtenstein footballers
Liechtenstein youth international footballers
Liechtenstein under-21 international footballers
Liechtenstein international footballers
Swiss men's footballers
Swiss people of Liechtenstein descent
People with acquired Liechtenstein citizenship
Association football central defenders
FC Vaduz players
USV Eschen/Mauren players
Sportspeople from Ticino